Sayula is a municipality  located in the plains of the Sotavento zone in the central zone of the State of Veracruz in Mexico, about 382 km from state capital Xalapa.

Geographic Limits

The municipality of Sayula is delimited to the north by Acayucan, to the east by Oluta and Texistepec, to the south by Jesús Carranza and to the west by San Juan Evangelista.  It is watered by rivers of the San Juan, which is a tributary of the river Papaloapan and for other tributaries of the Río Chiquito, and the brazo de Coatzacoalcos.

Agriculture

It produces principally maize, beans, rice, orange fruit, coffee, mango and green chile.

Celebrations

In Sayula, in May takes place the celebration in honor to San Isidro Labrador, Patron of the town, and in December takes place the celebration in honor to Virgen de Guadalupe.

Weather

The weather in  Sayula  is warm  and wet all year with rains in summer and autumn.

References

External links 

  Municipal Official webpage
  Municipal Official Information

Municipalities of Veracruz